Ghasola is a village in Charkhi Dadri District in the Indian state of Haryana. The village has a higher secondary school for boys and a high school for girls. 

Villages in Charkhi Dadri district